The Statue of Queen Victoria, currently in Sydney, New South Wales, Australia, was made by John Hughes in 1908 and was originally located in Dublin. Made of bronze, it is situated on the corner of Druitt and George Street in front of the Queen Victoria Building. It was the last royal statue to have been erected in Ireland.

Sculpture
The Queen toured Ireland in April 1900, prompting the Royal Dublin Society to propose a national monument to her. Her death nine months later spurred a second burst of enthusiasm. John Hughes, instructor in Modelling at the Dublin Metropolitan School of Art, was commissioned to create the statue and moved his studio to Paris to cast the work. It was his most important commission to date. Almost a decade later, it was unveiled in Dublin, Ireland, in the enclosed courtyard of Leinster House on 17 February 1908. At a ceremony with 1000 troops on parade, the Lord Lieutenant declared "we are assembled here to dedicate this noble work of art to the perpetual commemoration of a great personality and a great life."

The statue shows an effort to portray Victoria Regina as the 'Irish Queen' rather than the 'British Sovereign'. She is seated in a low chair rather than an elaborate throne, allowing the artist to contain the figure within a sphere rather than as a towering pillar. (Other seated examples place her on a high throne.) And she wears a simple coronet rather than the royal or imperial crown...Moreover, the statue portrayed her as the Sovereign Head of the Most Illustrious Order of St Patrick, Ireland's order of chivalry dating from 1783. The star on her left breast, and the pendant badge, feature shamrocks, crowned harps, and St Patrick's Cross. The St Patrick reference probably backfired. It confirmed Ireland's colonial subordination. Round her neck the chain alternates the red and white roses of England.

The statue sat atop a portland stone column, also designed by Hughes, with three sculptural groups to be placed below – "Fame", "Hibernia at Peace" and "Hibernia at War". This last group was also known as "Erin and the Dying Soldier" and referred to the loyalty demonstrated by Irish soldiers in the Boer War.

Location

Ireland
In 1922, 14 years after the statue's installation, Leinster House had become the seat of the Irish parliament, the Oireachtas, and nationalistic sentiment disapproved of having a British queen celebrated in such a location. The statue had by now been given the nickname "The auld bitch" by Irish writer James Joyce. In August 1929 The Irish Times reported that discussions were under way to remove the statue “on the basis that its continued presence there is repugnant to national feeling, and that, from an artistic point of view, it disfigures the architectural beauty of the parliamentary buildings.”

It was removed from its original location in July 1948 and replaced with a carpark. It was transported by lorry to the Royal Hospital Kilmainham and, along with the associated three sculptural groups, was placed in a courtyard and left, developing a patina. The hospital had also been a proposed site for the parliament, and was used as a storage location for property belonging to the National Museum of Ireland. It is now the Irish Museum of Modern Art. Attempts to send the sculpture to London, Ontario did not succeed as neither the Canadian nor Irish governments wished to pay the cost of transport. In February 1980 the statue was transferred to a yard behind a disused children's reformatory at Daingean, County Offaly.

The associated sculptures from the base of the statue are currently in the collection of Dublin Castle.

Australia
In the mid-1980s, the iconic Queen Victoria Building in central Sydney was undergoing major renovations after decades of disuse, and appropriate public art was being sought for the entrance. Neil Glasser, Director of Promotions for the company undertaking the renovations (Singapore's Ipoh Gardens Ltd), travelled to several former British colonies in the hope of finding a statue. After a "considerable amount of sleuthing", the statue, sitting in long grass behind the reformatory, was rediscovered and proposed to be moved to Australia. In order to obtain approval, Glasser contacted John Teahan, the Director of the National Museum of Ireland, and Sydney's Lord Mayor contacted the Irish Ambassador in Canberra. In August 1986 Fine Gael Taoiseach, Garret FitzGerald, authorised that the statue be given to Australia "on loan until recalled". Subsequently, declassified cabinet papers showed that the plan was opposed by the then finance minister John Bruton (later to be Taoiseach), as well as Teahan, on the basis that it represented the work of an Irish artist and "...representative of one of the many traditions of Irish history".

The statue was transported by sea to Australia that year, restored in Sydney, and installed at its present location 43 years after it had last been on display. Despite heavy rain an unveiling ceremony took place on Sunday 20 December 1987 overseen by Eric Neal, Chief Commissioner of Sydney, and Dermot Brangan, first secretary at the Irish embassy to Australia. The irony of the British Queen being "transported" to Australia by ship was not lost on the Irish media. In the days before the unveiling the embassy and the Daily Telegraph newspaper received anonymous threats of violence and protest about "the propriety of an Irish government giving a statue of Victoria as a gift."

A second statue nearby is of the Queen's favourite pet, a Skye Terrier named "Islay", begging above a wishing well on behalf of the Royal Institute for Deaf and Blind Children. At a cost of $10,000, Sydney sculptor Justin Robson modelled the bronze work from an 1843 sketch by the Queen. The location of the statue is actually to disguise the ventilation shaft for the new carpark underneath the renovated building. The wishing well also includes "a poem telling the story of Islay which will be specially translated into Braille, four proverbs highlighting the morality of giving in six different languages, and a piece of stone from Blarney Castle, Ireland." Since 1998, a recorded request for donations, supposedly being "spoken" by Islay, has been played at regular intervals from hidden loudspeakers. The recording says, "Because of the many good deeds I've done for deaf and blind children, I have been given the power of speech", and then expresses thanks for donations. It is voiced by local radio personality John Laws and concludes with two barks, also by Laws.

See also
 List of statues of Queen Victoria
 Cloud Arch, a major proposed sculpture to be placed nearby

References

 

Australia–Ireland relations
Sydney
Buildings and structures completed in 1908
Monuments and memorials in Sydney
1908 establishments in Australia